Derrick James (born January 23, 1972) is an American boxing trainer and former professional boxer. He was voted Trainer of the Year by The Ring magazine in 2017, and by the Yahoo Sports.

As of February 2023, he is currently the trainer for Anthony Joshua.

External links
 The Ring Trainer of the year 2017
 
 How Derrick James became the best boxing trainer - Yahoo! Sports (Yahoo Sports Trainer of the year 2017)

Living people
American boxing trainers
1972 births
Place of birth missing (living people)
American male boxers